This is a list of corticosteroid cyclic ketals, including cyclic ketals (cyclic acetals) of steroidal glucocorticoids and mineralocorticoids. They are almost all C16α,17α cyclic ketals of corticosteroids. One of the most widely used corticosteroid cyclic ketals is triamcinolone acetonide, which is the C16α,17α acetonide (cyclic ketone with acetone) of triamcinolone.

This list mostly does not include esters of corticosteroid cyclic ketals, which are listed here instead.

Acetonides
Acetonides (cyclic ketals with acetone):

 Cicortonide
 Ciprocinonide (fluocinolone acetonide cyclopropylcarboxylate)
 Descinolone acetonide (desoxytriamcinolone acetonide)
 Desonide (desfluorotriamcinolone acetonide)
 Drocinonide
 Fluclorolone acetonide (flucloronide)
 Fludroxycortide (flurandrenolide, flurandrenolone)
 Flumoxonide
 Flunisolide
 Fluocinolone acetonide
 Fluocinonide (fluocinolone acetonide 21-acetate)
 Flupamesone (triamcinolone acetonide metembonate)
 Formocortal
 Halcinonide
 Procinonide (fluocinolone acetonide propionate)
 Tralonide
 Triamcinolone acetonide
 Triamcinolone benetonide (triamcinolone acetonide 21-(benzoyl-β-aminoisobutyrate))
 Triamcinolone furetonide (triamcinolone acetonide 21-(2-benzofurancarboxylate))
 Triamcinolone hexacetonide (triamcinolone acetonide 21-tebutate)
 Triclonide

Others

Acetophenides
Acetophenides (cyclic ketals with acetophenone):

 Algestone acetophenide (dihydroxyprogesterone acetophenide)
 Amcinafide (triamcinolone acetophenide)

Acroleinides
Acroleinides (cyclic ketals with acrolein):

 Acrocinonide (triamcinolone acroleinide)

Aminobenzals
Aminobenzals (cyclic ketals with 4-dimethylaminobenzylidene):

 Triamcinolone aminobenzal benzamidoisobutyrate (TBI-PAB)

Cyclopentanonides
Cyclopentanonides (cyclic ketals with cyclopentanone):

 Amcinonide (triamcinolone acetate cyclopentanonide)

Pentanonides
Pentanonides (cyclic ketals with 3-pentanone)

 Amcinafal (triamcinolone pentanonide)

With butyraldehyde
Cyclic ketals with butyraldehyde:

 Budesonide
 Dexbudesonide
 Itrocinonide
 Rofleponide

Miscellaneous
 Nicocortonide is a C14α,17α cyclic ketal with crotonaldehyde

See also
 List of corticosteroids
 Steroid ester
 List of corticosteroid esters

References

Corticosteroid cyclic ketals
Corticosteroids
Glucocorticoids